Great Women of Country is the studio album by Australian country music singers Melinda Schneider and Beccy Cole. It was released through Universal Music Australia in 7 November 2014 and peaked at number 9 on the ARIA Charts.

Background
The collection brings together Schneider and Cole's love of country music. Schneider said she had thought about a tribute album for some time, but the idea to record a joint album was 'a flash of inspiration'.
“Both Beccy and I had always thought about doing an album like this individually … but I woke up one morning and the idea wouldn't leave me alone, so I called Beccy and asked: wanna do it together?” Cole said; “They're timeless, they were old even then! These are some of the songs that I drew from to make my own music, to get to pay tribute to them by recording and performing new versions is a great responsibility but such an honour.”

Touring
The pair toured the album between November 2014 and March 2015.

Reception
Ovation Channel said; "Great Women of Country is not just a rich legacy of songs, it is the inevitable collaboration of two of Australia's most accomplished and most experienced country music stars – singers well equipped to reach back and bring forward music that holds a very special place in people's hearts."

Track listing
 "9 to 5" (Dolly Parton) – 3:27
 "One's on the Way" (Shel Silverstein) – 2:39
 "The Night the Lights Went Out in Georgia" (Bobby Russell) – 4:11
 "Your Good Girl's Gonna Go Bad" (Billy Sherrill, Glenn Sutton) – 2:02
 "Angel of the Morning" (Chip Taylor) – 4:08
 "D-I-V-O-R-C-E" (Bobby Braddock, Curly Putman – 2:58
 "Ode to Billie Joe" (Bobbie Gentry) – 4:21
 "Stand by Your Man" (Tammy Wynette, Billy Sherrill) – 2:37
 "Grandpa (Tell Me 'Bout the Good Ol' Days)" (Jamie O'Hara) – 3:41
 "Mule Skinner Blues" (Jimmie Rodgers, George Vaughan)/ "Rocky Top" (Felice and Boudleaux Bryant) – 2:59
 "Crazy" (Willie Nelson) – 2:47
 "Harper Valley PTA" (Tom T. Hall) – 3:15
 "Banks of the Ohio" / "If Not for You" (Bob Dylan)/ "Let Me Be There" (John Rostill) – 3:54
 "I Fall to Pieces" (Hank Cochran, Harlan Howard) / "Walking After Midnight" (Alan Block, Donn Hecht) – 4:22
 "I Will Always Love You" (Dolly Parton) – 4:12
 "Could I Have This Dance" (Wayland Holyfield, Bob House) / "Tennessee Waltz" (Pee Wee King, Redd Stewart) – 3:46
 "Blue Bayou" (Roy Orbison, Joe Melson) – 3:59
 "Jolene" (Dolly Parton) – 2:49
 "Coat of Many Colours" (Dolly Parton) – 3:05
 "Queen of Hearts" (Hank DeVito) – 3:20
 "I Can't Make You Love Me" (Mike Reid, Allen Shamblin) – 5:00
 "Love Hurts" (Felice and Boudleaux Bryant) – 3:44

Charts
Great Women of Country become Schneider's and Cole's highest charting and first top ten album on the ARIA Chart.

Weekly Charts

Year-end charts

Release history

References

2014 albums
Beccy Cole albums
Covers albums
Collaborative albums
Universal Music Australia albums